Drift Pile River 150 is an Indian reserve of the Driftpile Cree Nation in Alberta, located within Big Lakes County. It is 6 kilometers southeast of Lesser Slave Lake. In the 2016 Canadian Census, it recorded a population of 828 living in 258 of its 277 total private dwellings.

References

Big Lakes County
Indian reserves in Alberta
Cree reserves and territories